Mlolah (IPA: Mlōlaḥ)  is a Syrian village located in Al-Hamraa Nahiyah in Hama District, Hama.  According to the Syria Central Bureau of Statistics (CBS), Mlolah had a population of 377 in the 2004 census. During Syria civil war, Mlolah was captured by ISIS, then on 6 February 2018, SAA captured this town.

References 

Populated places in Hama District